Rhipha is a genus of moths in the family Erebidae. The genus was erected by Francis Walker in 1854.

Species

 Rhipha albiplaga Schaus, 1905
 Rhipha chionoplaga Dognin, 1913
 Rhipha flammans Hampson, 1901
 Rhipha flammula Hayward, 1947
 Rhipha flavoplaga Schaus, 1905
 Rhipha flavoplagiata Rothschild, 1911
 Rhipha fulminans Rothschild, 1916
 Rhipha gagarini Travassos, 1955
 Rhipha ignea Grados & Ramírez, 2016
 Rhipha leucoplaga Dognin, 1910
 Rhipha luteoplaga Rothschild, 1922
 Rhipha mathildae Köhler, 1926
 Rhipha niveomaculata Rothschild, 1909
 Rhipha perflammans Dognin, 1914
 Rhipha persimilis Rothschild, 1909
 Rhipha pulcherrima Rothschild, 1935
 Rhipha strigosa Walker, 1854
 Rhipha subflammans Rothschild, 1909
 Rhipha vivia Watson, 1975

Former species
 Rhipha uniformis Rothschild, 1909

References

Phaegopterina
Moth genera